Patricia Mary Bishop (13 June 1946 – 28 March 2000) was an Australian actress, born in Belfast, Northern Ireland noted for her performances in theatre, film and television series.
She was married to the renowned Australian actor Bill Hunter in 1976 however, according to writer Bob Ellis, the marriage was short-lived after Hunter ran off with their marriage celebrant.

She received an AACTA Award for Best Actress in a Leading Role for her representation of Jenny in the 1976 film Don's Party.

Bishop also appeared frequently on television, with credits including: Contrabandits, The Link Men, Homicide, Division 4, Matlock Police, Spyforce,  Number 96, A Country Practice, Brides of Christ, Water Rats, Blue Heelers, A Step in the Right Direction and All Saints.
 
She is probably best known for her role in Prisoner as gangster's wife Antonia McNally in 1979 and also acted in theatre

Partial filmography
Human Target (1974)
Don's Party (1976) - Jenny
Scorpion (1986) - Spain: Cab Driver
The Right Hand Man (1987)
Dad and Dave: On Our Selection (1995) - Maude White
Soft Fruit (1999) - Nursing Sister

References

External links
 

1946 births
2000 deaths
Australian film actresses
Australian soap opera actresses
National Institute of Dramatic Art alumni
Australian people of Irish descent
Best Actress AACTA Award winners
20th-century Australian actresses